A Bergamt or mining office is a mining supervisory authority in German-speaking countries below the level of the state. It exercises immediate supervision of all activities, facilities and equipment associated with mining within a mining district. This includes the promotion and monitoring of operational safety and workplace safety.

Germany 
In Germany, the legal basis for the supervision of mining operations is the Federal Mining Act (Bundesberggesetz). The states are responsible for the execution of the act through their respective state authorities which are:
Freiburg Regional Authority (Regierungspräsidium Freiburg) for Baden-Württemberg
North Bavaria Mining Office (Bergamt Nordbayern) and South Bavaria Mining Office (Bergamt Südbayern) for Bavaria
State Office of Mining, Geology and Raw Materials (Landesamt für Bergbau, Geologie und Rohstoffe) for Berlin and Brandenburg
State Office of Mining, Energy and Geology (Landesamt für Bergbau, Energie und Geologie) for Bremen, Hamburg, Lower Saxony and Schleswig-Holstein
Darmstadt (Regierungspräsidium Darmstadt), Gießen (Regierungspräsidium Gießen) and Kassel (Regierungspräsidium Kassel) regional authorities for Hesse
Stralsund Mining Office (Bergamt Stralsund) for Mecklenburg-Western Pomerania
Arnsberg Regional Authority (Bezirksregierung Arnsberg), office in Dortmund, previously Landesoberbergamt Nordrhein-Westfalen in Dortmund
State Office of Geology and Mining (Landesamt für Geologie und Bergbau) for Rhineland-Palatinate
Saarbrücken Mining Office (Bergamt Saarbrücken), subordinate to the Head Mining Office of the Saar (Oberbergamt des Saarlandes)
Saxon Mining Office (Sächsisches Oberbergamt) for Saxony
State Office of Geology and Mining (Landesamt für Geologie und Bergwesen) for Saxony-Anhalt
Thuringian State Mining Office (Thüringer Landesbergamt) for Thuringia

Austria 
In Austria it used to be the Berghauptmannschaft until the Mineral Raw Material Act came into force on 1 January 1999, when that was replaced by the Montanbehörden.

Netherlands 
In the Netherlands, state supervision of mining is carried out by the Staatstoezicht op de Mijnen (SodM). An important role is its oversight of oil extraction in the North Sea.

Regional Mining Offices 
 Bergamt Kamen

Historic Mining Offices 
 Bergamt Hamm

See also 
 Bergordnung
 Bergrecht
 Bergregal
 Saxon Mining Office
 Mining in the Harz

External links 
  Austrian Mineran Raw Materials Act
 The North Rhine-Westphalia Head Mining Office, historic summary of the development and history of the office
 Westphalia: History of Mining Supervision in Westphalia

Mining organizations
Mining in Germany
Mining law and governance